The Andradas Fort (originally ) is a fortification in the Morro do Monduba, at Guarujá, in the state of São Paulo in Brazil.

Purpose 

The fort was constructed, along with the Itaipu Fortress, in order to defend Santos bay and its port. It was home to the 5th Independent Battery of Artillery of Coast.

Design 

An observatory post, with a telescope and a pair of telemeters, calculated distances and positions of the ships approaching the bay. It was designed so that most of the structure was underground and hidden behind an "invisible curtain" of trees.

Construction and operation 

The fort was designed in 1934. Construction started in 1938 to provide protection of the port during World War II. It was inaugurated on 10 November 1942 as Forte do Monduba - the last fort in Brazil to be inaugurated. It was later renamed as the Andradas Fort after José Bonifácio de Andrada, Antônio Carlos Ribeiro de Andrada and Martim Francisco Ribeiro de Andrada.

It housed political prisoners, including Eduardo Collen Leite, during the military dictatorship in the 1960s.

The fortification was decommissioned in 1972, with the last 32 grenades launched in a training exercise with  range on 28 January 1972. The military base continues to operate as support for the Peace Headquarters and the 1st Brazilian Anti-Aircraft Artillery Brigade.

Preservation 

The fort is now preserved. It is located in the Morro do Monduba, a  preserve that is part of the Atlantic Forest, on Guarujá. Tours of the fort started in 2016.

Tours of the fort are free, and take place on Tuesday, Thursday, Friday, Saturday and Sunday at 09.00 and 14.00. They have to be scheduled in advance by phone or email. The entrance to the fortification is on Rua Horácio Barreiro, in Tombo.

References 

Forts in Brazil
São Paulo (state)